Petrophila constellalis is a moth in the family Crambidae. It was described by George Hampson in 1897. It is found in Brazil.

References

Petrophila
Moths described in 1897
Moths of South America